The Nikolay Akimov Saint Petersburg Comedy Theatre is a theatre at 56 Nevsky Prospect, Saint Petersburg, Russia.

References

Theatres in Saint Petersburg
Theatres completed in 1929